Herbert Tuttle (1846–1894) was an American historian.

Biography
Herbert Tuttle was born in Bennington, Vermont on November 29, 1846.

He graduated in 1869 from the University of Vermont. From 1880 to 1881 he was a lecturer on international law at the University of Michigan, and in the latter year was appointed to the chair of politics and international law at Cornell University. He was subsequently transferred to the chair of European history in the Department of History.

He married Mary McArthur on July 6, 1875.

He died in Ithaca, New York on June 21, 1894.

Books
 German Political Leaders (1876)
 History of Prussia to the Accession of Frederick the Great (1884)
 History of Prussia under Frederick the Great (1888)

References

 

1846 births
1894 deaths
19th-century American historians
19th-century American male writers
Cornell University faculty
Cornell University Department of History faculty
University of Vermont alumni
People from Bennington, Vermont
University of Michigan Law School faculty
American male non-fiction writers